Hamdi bin Abu Bakar is a Malaysian politician from UMNO. He was the Member of Perak State Legislative Assembly for Pengkalan Baharu in the Perak State Legislative Assembly from 1990 to 2013.

Politics 
On 12 October 2008, he lost in the UMNO Beruas branch chairman election to Abdul Manaf Hashim despite being the state assemblyman and the incumbent branch chairman.

Election result

Honours
 : 
  Companion of the Order of the Defender of the Realm (JMN) (2013)
  :
  Knight Commander of the Order of the Perak State Crown (DPMP) – Dato' (1996)

Reference 

Companions of the Order of the Defender of the Realm
United Malays National Organisation politicians
Malaysian Islamic Party politicians
Members of the Perak State Legislative Assembly
Malaysian people of Malay descent
Living people
Year of birth missing (living people)